Gediminas Truskauskas (born 2 January 1998 in Vilnius, Lithuania) is a Lithuanian sprinter, who specializes in the 200m. He ran his personal best and a national record of 20.48 at Eisenstadt on the 9th of June 2021.

Gediminas Truskauskas qualified for the 2020 Olympics via world rankings.

Achievements

References

1998 births
Living people
Lithuanian male sprinters
Sportspeople from Vilnius
Athletes (track and field) at the 2020 Summer Olympics
Olympic athletes of Lithuania
European Games competitors for Lithuania
Athletes (track and field) at the 2019 European Games